Hi Fly Malta is a Maltese charter airline based at Malta International Airport and a subsidiary of the Portuguese charter airline Hi Fly.

History
Hi Fly Malta started operations in early 2013 with one Airbus A340-600 formerly operated by Virgin Atlantic with one more pre-owned on order. The airline had also applied for an Air Operators Certificate and planned to start scheduled operations to destinations in North America. During 2015, all of the airlines' aircraft had been stored and in May 2015 the A340-600s were sold to Al Naser Airlines, a front company for Mahan Air.

Hi Fly Malta was reactivated on September with the re-registration of one A340-300 from the parent Portuguese company on the Maltese Business Registry and a second A340-300 was added in early 2016 that had previously flown for Sri Lankan Airlines. Several former Emirates A340-300 frames were added in 2017.

In the summer of 2018, Hi Fly became the first airline to order secondhand Airbus A380 aircraft, placing an order for two aircraft. In autumn 2017, Hi Fly, in a sponsorship of the Turn the Tide on Plastic yacht team in the Volvo Ocean Race, painted one of its A330s in a livery similar to the yacht, with the port side bearing a dirty oceans livery and the starboard side a clean oceans livery. On 19 July 2018, its newly painted Airbus A380, registered as 9H-MIP, arrived at the Farnborough Airshow, carrying the Save the Coral Reefs livery. Hi-Fly's A380 saw a brief lease to Norwegian Long Haul in August 2018, which operated the aircraft following engine problems with its Boeing 787 Dreamliner fleet. Norwegian leased the A380 again in late 2018 to help deal with the passenger backlog as a result of the Gatwick Airport drone incident. In July 2020, following the downturn of passenger flight traffic resulting from the COVID-19 pandemic, the A380 was reconfigured for use as a freight carrier, with most of its seats removed. In November 2020, the company announced that the A380 will be retired at the end of its three-year lease period. On 17 December 2020, the A380 made its final flight to Toulouse.

One A319 was chartered to the defunct Brazilian Itapemirim Transportes Aéreos. In November 2021, it landed at Rio de Janeiro–Galeão International Airport to be transformed in regular passenger carrier at TAP Hangar, but this never happened. The license changed to PS-SIL was changed back to 9H-XFW and after 3 months in Brazil, was scheduled to fly back to Europe.

Destinations
Hi Fly Malta has no scheduled destinations. Its planes operate on a charter and ACMI basis. One of its planes was to have been reconfigured for Swiss Space Systems prior to its liquidation, and retained a black livery with the Swiss Space Systems logo on the stabilizer prior to its retirement, while all other frames are unmarked except for registration.

Fleet

Current

As of October 2022, the Hi Fly Malta fleet consists of the following aircraft:

Former

See also
List of airlines of Malta

References

External links
 
 Official website

Airlines of Malta
Airlines established in 2013
2013 establishments in Malta